The 1998–99 Irish League Cup (known as the Coca-Cola League Cup for sponsorship reasons) was the 13th edition of Northern Ireland's secondary football knock-out cup competition. It concluded on 4 May 1999 with the final.

Linfield were the defending champions after their fourth League Cup win last season; a 1–0 victory over Glentoran in the previous final. This season they became the first club ever to successfully defend the trophy. In a repeat of the previous final, Linfield once again came out on top with a 2–1 victory against Glentoran in the final, lifting the cup for the fifth time and condemning the Glens to defeat in the final for the third season running, which is a record for successive final defeats in the competition that still stands.

The competition was re-structured this season, allowing only the 10 top-flight clubs and the 8 second-tier clubs to enter. This reduced the number of clubs taking part from 32 down to 18.

Preliminary round

|}

First round

|}

Quarter-finals

|}

Semi-finals

|}

Final

References

Lea
1998–99 domestic association football cups
1998–99